U road may refer to:

 Unclassified roads in the United Kingdom :
 U roads in Great Britain
 U roads on the Isle of Man
 One of the numbered state highways in Utah, United States: See List of state highways in Utah
 Corridor U, part of the Appalachian Development Highway System